Emperor's Holidays is a 2015 Chinese family film directed by Wang Yuelun. The film was released on February 19, 2015.

Cast
 Guo Tao
 Jimmy Lin
 Zhang Liang
 Wang Yuelun
 Tian Liang
 Sung Dong-il
 Kim Jeong-hoon
 Jang Gwang
 Jeong Kyeong-ho
 Sung Joon
 Sung Bin
 Angela Wang
 Kimi Lin
 Zhang Yuexuan
 Patrick Guo
 Li Jing
 Sha Yi
 Wang Taili
 Mike Sui
 Zhang Beibei

References

External links

Chinese comedy films
2015 films
Films based on television series